Gregory Forth, also known as Gregory L. Forth, is a retired professor of anthropology at the University of Alberta. He earned his PhD from University of Oxford in 1980. Beginning in 1986, Forth was a professor at the University of Alberta for over thirty years. Forth is a fellow of the Royal Society of Canada.

As a social anthropologist, Forth's position is both structuralist and interpretivist. He is known for his contributions to ethnoscience.

Forth has conducted fieldwork in eastern Indonesia, and has worked with the Kéo and Nage of Flores island. He believes that the folk creature ebu gogo may in fact be Homo floresiensis.

In November 2020, his book A Dog Pissing at the Edge of a Path: Animal Metaphors in Eastern Indonesian Society won the Bookseller/Diagram Prize for Oddest Title of the Year.

In February 2023, Forth suggests in his book, Between Ape and Human: An Anthropologist on the Trail of a Hidden Hominoid, based on stories told by natives of Flores, Indonesia, that the diminutive humanlike Homo floresiensis creatures could still be alive in Indonesia.

Publications

References

Year of birth missing (living people)
Living people
Canadian anthropologists
Flores Island (Indonesia)